Greatest Hits is the first compilation album released by British pop and soul group Simply Red, which contained material from their first five studio albums (Picture Book, Men and Women, A New Flame, Stars and Life) and included a newer track, a cover of Aretha Franklin's 1973 classic, "Angel".

Track listing
 "Holding Back the Years" (Mick Hucknall, Neil Moss) – 4:12 from Picture Book
 "Money's Too Tight (to Mention)" (John Valentine, William Valentine) – 4:29 from Picture Book
 "The Right Thing" (Hucknall) – 4:22 from Men and Women
 "It's Only Love" (Jimmy Cameron, Vella Cameron) – 3:52 from A New Flame
 "A New Flame" (Hucknall) – 3:58 from A New Flame
 "You've Got It" (Hucknall, Lamont Dozier) – 3:58 from A New Flame
 "If You Don't Know Me By Now" (Kenny Gamble, Leon Huff) – 3:26 from A New Flame
 "Stars" (Hucknall) – 4:08 from Stars
 "Something Got Me Started" (Hucknall, Fritz McIntyre) – 4:00 from Stars
 "Thrill Me" (Hucknall, McIntyre) – 5:04 from Stars
 "Your Mirror" (Hucknall) – 4:00 from Stars
 "For Your Babies" (Hucknall) – 4:18 from Stars
 "So Beautiful" (Hucknall) – 5:00 from Life
 "Angel" (Carolyn Franklin, Sonny Saunders) – 4:01 Previously unreleased
 "Fairground" (Hucknall) – 4:27 from Life

Charts

Weekly charts

Year-end charts

Certifications

References

1996 greatest hits albums
East West Records compilation albums
Simply Red albums